The Axis of Evil Comedy Tour is a comedy tour featuring four Middle Eastern comedians and special guest comedians. The tour's name is derived from a speech by US President George W. Bush which designated Iraq, Iran, and North Korea as the "axis of evil". The tour started on 11 November 2005. The group jokes about their culture along with being Middle Eastern in America. All of the comedians state that their lives changed considerably with 9/11, with one member, Egyptian American Ahmed Ahmed, whose name matches the alias used by an Osama bin Laden henchman, noting that he is frequently stopped by airport immigration officials on suspicion of terrorism – including a 12-hour stint in a jail in Las Vegas. On 10 March 2007, they were given their own Comedy Central special. The group broke up in 2011.

The group's current-events sense of humor has attracted media attention. They have been interviewed by CNN, NPR, The New York Times, and Time, among others. They toured in several Midddle East countries with Showtime Arabia. King Abdullah II of Jordan has attended their show in Jordan and has conveyed his appreciation of their work.

Background

The Axis of Evil Comedy Tour was founded by standup comedian Ahmed Ahmed, to wield jokes as weapons and combat post-9/11 prejudice in the United States. Along with Ahmed, the featuring comedians (Maz Jobrani and Aron Kader) had their own personal accounts of racist experiences that they have undergone within the United States, and used these stories as material for the comedy tour. 
Ahmed Ahmed, the Egyptian American and founder of the group, believed that post-9/11 standup material should be tested in the Middle East before traveling anywhere else. Before the group had even been formed, Ahmed had been hired to perform a private show in Dubai, to fundraise and put Palestinian kids through medical school. This led to the tour he called the "Axis of Evil Tour", in which he featured comics Maz Jobrani, Aron Kader, and himself to travel the United States with the aim to stop stereotyping and prejudice towards Middle Easterners through a comedic approach.

Jamil Abu-Wardeh, the producer of the Axis of Evil, was the one who brought the tour back to its origin, the Middle East. There, the comedy tour gained two additional members, Nemr Abou Nassar and Wonho Chung. Wonho was known especially for his ability to present the material in Arabic, despite having a Korean descent. His ability to speak in Arabic and other languages, as well as his charisma made him a vital addition of the tour. Nemr performed in five sold-out shows, during each of which his performance received a standing ovation. The tour featured performances in Kuwait, UAE, Lebanon, Bahrain, and other Arab countries.
According to The New York Times, the result was a success, beginning with the selling out of numerous performances from the first one at Lisner Auditorium at George Washington University.

Main members

Guest members

DVD release
After airing on Comedy Central, the Axis of Evil Comedy Tour was released on DVD as a studio special by Image Entertainment on 3 April 2007. It was directed by Primetime Emmy nominee Michael Simon and featured the tour's four main comedians: Ahmed Ahmed, Aron Kader, Maz Jobrani, and Dean Obeidallah, as well as fellow actress and stand-up comedian Loni Love as Airport Security. The unrated DVD has a run time of 86 minutes and includes special features such as outtakes and behind-the-scenes footage. The DVD was also released in Sweden on 15 November 2008.
 
Review aggregation website Rotten Tomatoes gave the film a score of 83%, based on 490 reviews, averaging at 3.9/5. IMDb, another review aggregator that assigns a weighted mean rating, calculated an average score of 7.9/10, based on 397 reviews.
 
The special can be accessed through Amazon and Netflix.

Media reports
 In March 2007, Time featured an interview report praising the group's activity as "warfare by humorous means."
 In June 2007, CNN reported that the group's video on YouTube has recorded over 200,000 views and that it enjoyed a special slot on Comedy Central in March of the same year.
 In February 2008, Syrian Forward praised the group's effort with an article entitled "Stand-up Diplomacy" and reported that three major Arab networks have vied for broadcast rights of their performance at the New York Arab-American Comedy Festival.

References

External links
Stand-up Diplomacy!, Forward, February 2008
"'Axis of Evil' inspires laughs", CNN.com
"Stand-Up Diplomacy", Time
Interview at NPR's All Things Considered
NPR article
Axis of Evil at MySpace
Video of CNN's interview with Axis of Evil
Ahmed Ahmed talks about racial profiling on Axis of Evil tour

Nemr Abou Nassar

Comedy tours